El derecho de nacer ("The Right to Be Born") is a 1952 Mexican film directed by Zacarías Gómez Urquiza and starring Gloria Marín, Jorge Mistral and Martha Roth. It is based on a Cuban radionovela (radioplay) of the same name by Félix B. Caignet. The movie broke box office records in Mexico when it was first released; during its release in Mexico City in June 1952, it was shown at the downtown Cine Orfeón for seven straight weeks.

Plot
María Teresa (Bárbara Gil) is a wealthy young woman who finds herself unmarried and pregnant. She approaches a doctor (Jorge Mistral) to obtain an abortion with the hopes of avoiding a scandal that would affect her family. The doctor, hoping to convince her otherwise, flashes back to an incident of his life to explain his "right to life" stance.

Cast
Gloria Marín as María Elena
Jorge Mistral as Dr. Alberto Limonta
José Luis Moreno as Alberto Limonta Niño
José Baviera as Don Rafael
Gloria Alonso as Matildita Niña
Eugenia Galindo as Sra. de Dn. Nicolás 
Martha Roth as Isabel Cristina
José Baviera as Dn. Rafael del Junco
Lupe Suárez as Mamá Dolores
Bárbara Gil as María Teresa
José María Linares-Rivas as Jorge Luis Armenteros
Matilde Palou as Dña. Clemencia del Junco
Queta Lavat as Amelia
Tito Novaro as Alfredo Martínez
Salvador Quiroz as Don Nicolás
Manuel Trejo Morales as Ricardo del Castillo
Adelina Ramallo as Matildita
Rogelio Fernández as Bruno
José Escanero as Dr. Pezzi
Alfredo Varela padre as Doctor (uncredited)
Rubén Galindo (uncredited)

References

Bibliography
 Agrasánchez, Rogelio. Mexican Movies in the United States: A History of the Films, Theaters, and Audiences, 1920-1960. McFarland, 2006.

External links
 
Review of the movie on The New York Times
Profile and original poster
Félix B. Caignet
GLORIA MARÍN OFFICIAL SITE english

1952 films
1952 drama films
1950s Spanish-language films
Mexican drama films
Mexican black-and-white films
1950s Mexican films